is a railway station in Kizugawa, Kyoto, Japan.

Lines
West Japan Railway Company (JR West)
Katamachi Line (Gakkentoshi Line)

Adjacent Stations

History 
Station numbering was introduced in March 2018 with Nishi-Kizu being assigned station number JR-H19.

References

External links
Official Website(in Japanese)

Railway stations in Kyoto Prefecture
Railway stations in Japan opened in 1952